Shadow is a South African thriller streaming television series that premiered on March 8, 2019, on Netflix. It is the first original South African series to stream on Netflix.

Synopsis
Shadow follows the story of an ex-cop suffering from congenital analgesia, while taking vigilante justice into his own hands in the criminal underworld of Johannesburg.

Cast and characters

Main
 Pallance Dladla as Shadrach "Shadow" Khumalo
 Amanda Du-Pont as Ashley
 Khathu Ramabulana as Max
 Tumie Ngumla as Zola

Recurring
 Nnekwa Tsajwa as Mandla
 Lunathi Mampofu as Mary
 Phila Mazibuko as Reggie
 Altovise Lawrence as Abbey
 Julian Kruger as Frank 
 Themsie Times as Mrs. Maleka
 Bhekisizwe Mahlawe as James 
 Arno Botes as Benjamin
 Jude Okeke as Arnold
 Mamarumo Marokane as Janice
 Shadi Chauke as Lola
 Mohau Sonny as Gigi
 Phoenix Baaitse as Paka 
 Christiaan Cronje as Arthur
 Kaylin Reed as Young Shadow
 Didimalang Moagi as Ayanda
 Zekhetehelo Zondi as Zinhle

Production

Casting
Sometime after the series was acquired by Netflix, it was confirmed that Pallance Dladla and Amanda Du-Pont had been cast as series regulars.

Episodes

Release
On February 18, 2019, the official trailer for the series was released.

Notes

References

External links
 
 

English-language Netflix original programming
Serial drama television series
Thriller television series
Television shows set in South Africa
Television shows set in Johannesburg, South Africa
Television shows filmed in South Africa
South African drama television series
Vigilante television series